The 2017 Winmau World Masters was a major tournament on the BDO/WDF calendar for 2017. It took place from 25–27 September at the Bridlington Spa Hall, which hosted the stage element of the event for the first time since 2009.

Glen Durrant was the defending men’s champion after defeating Mark McGeeney in last year’s final by 6 sets to 3 but he failed to defend his title after losing to eventual champion Krzysztof Ratajski in the quarter-finals. Trina Gulliver was the defending women’s champion after defeating Deta Hedman in the final last year by 5 legs to 2 but she failed to defend her title after losing to Tricia Wright in the quarter-finals.

In the men’s, Ratajski won his first ever major as a player and that the first time a Polish player won a televised major. It was even more remarkable that he had to play through all of the qualifying rounds before meeting and defeating the number 7 seed Richard Veenstra in the last 32 by 3 sets to 1, Alan Soutar in the last 16 by 3 sets to nil, defending champion and number 2 seed Glen Durrant in the quarter-finals by 4 sets to 2, number 6 seed Cameron Menzies in the semi-finals by 5 sets to 1, and defeating number 1 seed Mark McGeeney in the final by 6 sets to 1.

The tournament was the last BDO tournament entered by Ratajski as a month after winning the event he accepted an offer to play in the 2018 PDC World Darts Championship and made the full switch to the PDC in January.

During an emergency EGM called due to the issues surrounding how the BDO was currently being run, it was announced that the tournament had recorded losses to the BDO of £80,000 and with that the future of the tournament is in doubt.

Men's seeds
The seedings were finalised on 31 August. For the second consecutive year, there are 16 seeds (an decrease from 32 between 2012–2015) with all seeds exempt until the Last 32 stage and cannot play each other until the Last 16 stage.

Men's draw (last 48 onwards)

Women's seeds

Women's draw

Boy's Draw

Girl's Draw

References

External links
 Men's results from dartsdatabase.co.uk
 Women's results from dartsdatabase.co.uk

World Masters
World Masters
World Masters (darts)
Bridlington
2010s in the East Riding of Yorkshire